Boreopelta is an extinct genus of rhytidosteid temnospondyl from the early Triassic period (Olenekian stage) of Yakutsk Region, central Siberia, Russia. It is known from the holotype PIN 4115/1, a skull fragment and from the referred specimen PIN 4113/5, a partial lower jaw, recovered from the Teryutekhskaya Formation near the Karya-khos-Teryutekh River. This genus was named by M. A. Shishkin and M. N. Vavilov in 1985, and the type species is Boreopelta vavilovi.

References

Prehistoric vertebrate genera
Prehistoric amphibians of Asia
Triassic temnospondyls of Asia
Fossil taxa described in 1985